Westerleigh is a residential neighborhood in the northwestern part of Staten Island in New York City.

Geography
Westerleigh is located in the northwest quadrant of the borough and is bounded in the east by Manor Road, the west by the Martin Luther King Jr. Expressway (New York State Route 440), the south by Victory Boulevard and to the north by Forest Avenue.

Westerleigh occupies high ground on Staten Island. While not as high as Todt Hill (the city's tallest point), from certain vantage points  Westerleigh affords views of Newark, New Jersey, and farther afield on a clear day.  The neighborhood has an abundance of coniferous and deciduous trees; including acacia, blue spruce, cedar, chestnut, elm, honey locust, paulownia, pin and royal oak, sweet gum, sycamore, tulip poplar, yew and many types of pine, some of which reach 75 feet (23 m) or more in height. On the neighborhood's southern side near the Staten Island Expressway is Ingram Woods, a remnant of a larger forest that has been preserved as an undeveloped park.

History

Westerleigh attracted notice when a temperance group, the National Prohibition Campground Association, bought 25 acres (10 ha) of land there in 1877, and named the property Prohibition Park — noted chiefly today for the fact that the official climate records for Staten Island are compiled at the site.  Many of the local streets are named after early leaders of the Prohibition movement (Neal Dow, Clinton B. Fisk), or for states that supported anti-liquor laws (such as Maine and Ohio).

Some of Westerleigh's earliest residents excelled in letters including Isaac K. Funk, co-founder of Funk and Wagnalls, and poet Edwin Markham.  Heiress Amy Vanderbilt also once lived there. 
The neighborhood gained much local attention for the abundance of patriotic decorations festooned on its homes in the aftermath of the September 11, 2001 attacks.

One of the oldest Boy Scouts of America groups, Troop #2, was formed in 1912 and operates out of the Immanuel Union Church on Jewett Avenue.  

Westerleigh is also home to the oldest tennis club in the US, tennis having been introduced to the US (from England, via Bermuda) at the home here of Mary Ewing Outerbridge. She played the first game in the US at the Staten Island Cricket Club on an hourglass shaped court. The location, on College Avenue, still sports a tennis court.

The Peter Houseman House was listed on the National Register of Historic Places in 1982.

Education

Schools
Many Westerleigh residents are zoned for PS 30, IS 51, Susan E. Wagner High School and Port Richmond High School.

Library
The New York Public Library (NYPL)'s Todt Hill-Westerleigh branch is located at 2550 Victory Boulevard on the border between Willowbrook and Westerleigh. The three-story branch opened in 1991.

Transportation
Westerleigh is served by a number of local and express buses. The  local bus and the  express buses to Manhattan run along Watchogue Road. The  local buses travel along Victory Boulevard, while the  local bus travels along Jewett Avenue. Farther north, the  local buses and the  express buses serve Forest Avenue, and the SIM35 also serve Manor Road at Westerleigh's eastern edge.

References

Neighborhoods in Staten Island